Thermosediminibacteraceae is a family of Gram positive bacteria in the class Clostridia.

Taxonomy
The currently accepted taxonomy is based on the List of Prokaryotic names with Standing in Nomenclature (LPSN) and National Center for Biotechnology Information (NCBI).

 Genus Caldanaerovirga Wagner et al. 2009
 C. acetigignens Wagner et al. 2009
 Genus Fervidicola Ogg & Patel 2009
 F. ferrireducens Ogg & Patel 2009
 Genus Thermosediminibacter Lee et al. 2006
 T. litoriperuensis Lee et al. 2006
 T. oceani Lee et al. 2006 (type sp.)
 Genus Thermovenabulum Zavarzina et al. 2002
 T. ferriorganovorum Zavarzina et al. 2002 (type sp.)
 T. gondwanense Ogg, Greene & Patel 2010
 Genus Thermovorax Makinen, Kaksonen & Puhakka 2012
 T. subterraneus Makinen, Kaksonen & Puhakka 2012

Phylogeny

See also
 List of bacteria genera
 List of bacterial orders

References 

Bacteria families
Clostridia
Thermophiles
Anaerobes